The Hikurua River is a river of the far north of New Zealand's North Island.

See also
List of rivers of New Zealand

References

Rivers of the Northland Region
Far North District
Rivers of New Zealand